Judge Ellen James Morphonios (September 30, 1929 – December 22, 2002) was a Dade County, Florida Circuit Judge, remembered for having prosecuted rock star Jim Morrison (The Doors) for allegedly exposing himself in her early days as a prosecutor. She was nicknamed "Maximum Morphonios" for the long sentences she routinely handed down to violent criminals.

A native of Hyde County, North Carolina, Morphonios was a former model and beauty queen who passed a Florida exam that allowed her to enter law school without an undergraduate degree. She was also a member of the international organization for people with intelligence quotients in the top 2%, Mensa.  Judge Morphonios was a member of the National Rifle Association and was an excellent marksman.  She appeared on many talk shows, including Donahue, Oprah and 60 Minutes, and was a frequent guest panelist on CNN.

Autobiography
She wrote an autobiography in 1991, Maximum Morphonios: The Life and Times of America's Toughest Judge.

Retirements
Morphonios retired following a series of corruption allegations that targeted a number of Dade County judges.  Despite efforts by the federal government, no allegations against Morphonios were ever substantiated. She returned briefly to the bench in 1997.

Death
Ellen Morphonios died on Sunday, December 22, 2002 from stomach cancer.

References

External links

1929 births
2002 deaths
Deaths from cancer in Florida
Deaths from stomach cancer
People from Miami-Dade County, Florida
People from Hyde County, North Carolina
Mensans
20th-century American judges
20th-century American women judges